Mittellateinisches Wörterbuch (MLW, Mittellateinisches Wörterbuch bis zum ausgehenden 13. Jahrhundert) is a project for the edition of a comprehensive Medieval Latin dictionary, organised by a committee of the Bavarian Academy of Sciences and Humanities and published with C. H. Beck.

The plan for a dictionary replacing Du Cange's Glossarium Mediæ et Infimæ Latinitatis originates with the  Union Académique Internationale, which established a Comité du dictionnaire du Latin médiéval  in 1919. A collaboration of French and German academies was planned in 1939, but interrupted by the Second World War. Seventeen fascicles for MLW were published during 1959–1976, but work was delayed (fascicle 18 in 1985), and the second volume (letter C) was completed only in 1999.  The third volume (D–E) was completed in 2007, and the fourth volume  (F–I) is close to completion as of 2016.

 I. Band.  1–10: A–B. 1967. 
 II. Band.   C. 1999. 
 III. Band: D – E.
 Lieferung 1 (25 des Gesamtwerks): d – defatigo. 2000. 
 Lieferung 2 (26 des Gesamtwerks): defatigo – densesco. 2001. 
 Lieferung 3 (27 des Gesamtwerks): densensco – desuesco. 2001. 
 Lieferung 4 (28 des Gesamtwerks): desuesco – digressus. 2002. 
 Lieferung 5 (29 des Gesamtwerks): digressus – dissertatio. 2003. 
 Lieferung 6 (30 des Gesamtwerks): dissertatio – dominum. 2004. 
 Lieferung 7 (31 des Gesamtwerks): dominum – efficientia. 2004. 
 Lieferung 8 (32 des Gesamtwerks): efficientia – enitor. 2005. 
 Lieferung 9 (33 des Gesamtwerks): enitor – evito. 2006. 
 Lieferung 10 (34 des Gesamtwerks): evito – eximius. 2007. 
 Lieferung 11 (35 des Gesamtwerks): eximius – ezemenius. 2007. 
 IV. Band: F – .
 Lieferung 1 (36 des Gesamtwerks): f – fero. 2008. 
 Lieferung 2 (37 des Gesamtwerks): fero – florificatio 2009. 
 Lieferung 3 (38 des Gesamtwerks): florificatio – frendor 2010. 
 Lieferung 4 (39 des Gesamtwerks): frendor – gelo 2011. 
 Lieferung 5 (40 des Gesamtwerks): gelo – gratuitus 2011. 
 Lieferung 6 (41 des Gesamtwerks): gratuitus – hebdomadarius 2012. 
 Lieferung 7 (42 des Gesamtwerks): hebdomadarius - horreo 2013. 
 Lieferung 8 (43 des Gesamtwerks): hospitalarius - illicio 2014. 
 Lieferung 9 (44 des Gesamtwerks): illibezzus - implumis 2015. 
 Lieferung 10 (45 des Gesamtwerks): implumis - incontra 2016. 
 Lieferung 11 (46 des Gesamtwerks): inconscriptus - infelix 2016.  (Angekündigt für Sept. 2016)

See also
Thesaurus Linguae Latinae

References 

 Teja Erb: Geschichte, Konzepte und Perspektiven der mittellateinischen Lexikographie im deutschen Sprachraum. In: Das Altertum. Band 47, 2002, S. 13–35 (vgl. Rezension von Wolfgang Maaz. In: Mittellateinisches Jahrbuch. Band 37, 2002, S. 355–357).
 Franz-J. Konstanciak: Mittellateinisches Wörterbuch. In: Thomas Städler (Hrsg.): Wissenschaftliche Lexikographie im deutschsprachigen Raum. Heidelberg 2003, S. 109–116.
 Franz-J. Konstanciak: Lexikographie. Das Mittellateinische Wörterbuch. Lateinische Sprache und Kultur im deutschsprachigen Raum. Die Entstehung eines wissenschaftlichen Großunternehmens und seine internationale Einbindung. In: Akademie Aktuell. Heft 2, 2003, S. 25–28.
 Theresia Payr: Dictionnaire du Latin médiéval. Remarques sur la méthode. In: La lexicographie du Latin médiéval et ses rapports avec les recherches actuelles sur la civilisation du Moyen-Age. Paris, 18–21 octobre 1978 (Colloques internationaux du C.N.R.S. 589). Paris 1981. S. 473–479.
 Otto Prinz: Le Mittellateinisches Wörterbuch. In: Archivum Latinitatis Medii Aevi. Band 28, 1958, S. 183–191.
 Otto Prinz: Mittellateinisches Wörterbuch. Entstehung und Anlage. In: Studi medievali- 3. Serie, Band 1, 1960, S. 296–303.
 Johannes Schneider: Entwicklung und Stand der Mittellateinischen Lexikographie. In: Forschungen und Fortschritte. Band 28, 1954, S. 281–285.
 Johannes Schneider: Mittellateinisches Wörterbuch. In: Das Institut für griechisch-römische Altertumskunde. Protokoll der Eröffnungstagung (Schriften der Sektion für Altertumswissenschaft 8). Berlin 1957, S. 148–158.
 Johannes Schneider: Grundlagen und Methoden der mittellateinischen Lexikographie in Deutschland. In: Studia Žródłonawcze. Commentationes IV, Poznán 1959, S. 149–152.
 Peter Schmidt: Zum Informationsgehalt des Mittellateinischen Wörterbuches, vor allem in Blick auf sozialökonomische Fragen. In: Philologus. Band 123, 1979, S. 129–136.
 Peter Stotz: Handbuch zur lateinischen Sprache der Mittelalters. Band 1, München 2002, S. 171–298.
 Peter Stotz: Nachruf Otto Prinz (1905–2003). Ein Pionier der mittellateinischen Lexikographie. In: Akademie Aktuell. Heft 2, 2003, S. 24.

External links
Online edition (woerterbuchnetz.de)

Latin dictionaries